The Golden Centennaires were a Royal Canadian Air Force (RCAF) aerobatic flying team that performed in 1967, the Canadian Centennial year. The team was created to celebrate the Canadian Centennial.
The eight-plane formation team, commanded by Wing Commander O. B. Philp C.M., DFC, CD, featured six-plane formations alternating with two solo aircraft. The aircraft used was the CT-114 Tutor, which sported a blue and gold paint scheme.

The Golden Centennaires performed 103 shows in Canada, including the opening and closing ceremonies of Expo 67 in Montreal, seven shows in the United States, and two shows in the Bahamas. The team was disbanded after the last show of the season, but the aircraft were used a few years later to form the Snowbirds, Canada's current national team.

Accompanying the Golden Centennaires were an Avro 504, a CF-104 Starfighter and a CF-101 Voodoo.  All of these aircraft performed at the Centennial airshows.

References

 Dempsey, Daniel V. A Tradition of Excellence: Canada's Airshow Team Heritage. Victoria, BC: High Flight Enterprises, 2002. .
 Milberry, Larry, ed. Sixty Years: The RCAF and CF Air Command 1924–1984. Toronto: Canav Books, 1984. .

Royal Canadian Air Force